Oliwia Jablonska (born 16 April 1997) is a Paralympic swimmer from Poland competing in S10 classification events. She competed at the 2020 Summer Paralympics, in Women's 400 metre freestyle S10, winning a bronze medal.

She competed at the 2012 Summer Paralympics, and 2016 Summer Paralympics.

References

External links 
 

1997 births
Living people
Polish female butterfly swimmers
Polish female freestyle swimmers
Polish female medley swimmers
S10-classified Paralympic swimmers
Paralympic swimmers of Poland
Paralympic gold medalists for Poland
Paralympic bronze medalists for Poland
Paralympic medalists in swimming
Swimmers at the 2012 Summer Paralympics
Swimmers at the 2016 Summer Paralympics
Swimmers at the 2020 Summer Paralympics
Medalists at the 2012 Summer Paralympics
Medalists at the 2016 Summer Paralympics
Medalists at the 2020 Summer Paralympics
Medalists at the World Para Swimming Championships
Medalists at the World Para Swimming European Championships
Sportspeople from Wrocław
21st-century Polish women